Plesiopharos (derived from the Greek words πλησίος (plesios), "close" and φάρος (pharos), "lighthouse", because its holotype was found in the vicinity of a lighthouse + [from São Pedro de] Moel) is an extinct plesiosaur that lived in what is now Portugal, in the Early Jurassic. Specifically, it was discovered in São Pedro de Moel, Marinha Grande, from which the type species' binomial name, Plesiopharos moelensis, derives from.

At the time of its publication (2021), this plesiosaur was the most complete and oldest known from the Iberian Peninsula.

Discovery 
 
The fossils were found by two collectors, António Silva (1999) and Vítor Teixeira (2012) and who donated them to the Lourinhã Museum in 2017 and were completely prepared in the Dino Parque laboratory.

Description 
The Plesiopharos holotype (ML 2302) consists of parts of the fin of the arm (humerus and radius), of the right leg (femur), pelvic girdle (pubis, ilium and ischium) of the thorax (vertebrae, ribs and gastralia) and of the neck (cervical vertebra). It would be an adult animal with an estimated size between 2.5 and 2.8 m.

Classification 
Plesiopharos moelensis is classified as a basal member of Plesiosauroidea.

Stratigraphy 
Plesiopharos moelensis was discovered at Praia da Concha, São Pedro de Moel, Marinha Grande, in layers that belong to the Coimbra Formation, which date to the Sinemurian.

References 

Plesiosauroids
Sauropterygian genera
Sinemurian life
Early Jurassic plesiosaurs of Europe
Jurassic Portugal
Fossils of Portugal
Fossil taxa described in 2021